Orientozeuzera caudata is a moth in the family Cossidae. It was described by James John Joicey and George Talbot in 1916. It is found in New Guinea. There are also records for Japan, Malaysia, Indonesia and the Solomon Islands, but these refer to Orientozeuzera rhabdota. The habitat consists of lowland areas.

References

Natural History Museum Lepidoptera generic names catalog

Zeuzerinae
Moths described in 1916